Antiscopa elaphra is a moth in the family Crambidae. It is endemic to New Zealand and has been observed in both the North and South Islands. Adults of this species are on the wing from August until March and are attracted to light. In 2020 this species had its DNA barcode sequenced.

Taxonomy

This species was first named Scoparia elaphra by Edward Meyrick in 1884. In 1885 Meyrick gave a detailed description of the species using specimens collected near Palmerston North and Christchurch. George Hudson discussed and illustrated this species under the name Scoparia acompa in his 1928 book The butterflies and moths of New Zealand. In 1964 Eugene Munroe placed this species in the genus Antiscopa. This placement was accepted by John S. Dugdale in 1988. The male lectotype, collected in Palmerston North, is held at the Natural History Museum, London.

Description

Meyrick described the adults of this species as follows:
This species can be distinguished from related species in its genus by its small size, long palpi, the sharp, triangular shape of, as well as the simple markings on, its forewings and its overall fragile appearance. In 2020 A. elphra  had its DNA barcode sequenced and published.

Distribution

It is endemic to New Zealand. The species has been observed in both the North and the South Islands.

Behaviour
Hudson stated that adults of this species were on the wing from August until March. Adults have also been recorded on wing in the West Coast from March until September. They are attracted to light.

References

Moths described in 1884
Scopariinae
Moths of New Zealand
Taxa named by Edward Meyrick
Endemic fauna of New Zealand
Endemic moths of New Zealand